Conus caysalensis is a species of sea snail, a marine gastropod mollusk in the family Conidae, the cone snails, cone shells or cones.

These snails are predatory and venomous. They are capable of "stinging" humans.

Description
The size of the shell varies between 13 mm and 20 mm.

Distribution
This marine species occurs off the Bahamas.

References

 Raybaudi, L. and Prati, A. 1994. A new species of Conidae from south-western Bahamas. World Shells 8:8-11, 7 figs.
 Puillandre N., Duda T.F., Meyer C., Olivera B.M. & Bouchet P. (2015). One, four or 100 genera? A new classification of the cone snails. Journal of Molluscan Studies. 81: 1-23

External links
 To World Register of Marine Species
 Cone Shells - Knights of the Sea
 Gastropods.com: Purpuriconus explorator caysalensis (var.)

caysalensis
Gastropods described in 1994